Lagochilus is a genus of the mint family that contains Turkistan mint (Lagochilus inebrians).

The genus is native to central, south-central, and eastern Asia (Iran, Pakistan, Kazakhstan, Mongolia, China, etc.).

Species
Lagochilus acutilobus (Ledeb.) Fisch. & C.A.Mey. - Kazakhstan, Uzbekistan
Lagochilus alutaceus Bunge - Iran
Lagochilus androssowii Knorring - Kazakhstan
Lagochilus aucheri Boiss. - Iran
Lagochilus balchanicus Czerniak. - Turkmenistan
Lagochilus botschantzevii Kamelin & Tzukerv. - Tajikistan, Uzbekistan
Lagochilus bungei Benth. - Kazakhstan, Xinjiang, Mongolia
Lagochilus cabulicus Benth. - Caucasus, Iran, Afghanistan, Pakistan, western Himalayas of northern India, Turkmenistan 
Lagochilus cuneatus Benth. - Afghanistan, Pakistan
Lagochilus diacanthophyllus (Pall.) Benth. - Kazakhstan, Uzbekistan, Kyrgyzstan, Xinjiang
Lagochilus drobovii Kamelin & Tzukerv. - Kyrgyzstan
Lagochilus grandiflorus C.Y.Wu & S.J.Hsuan - Xinjiang
Lagochilus gypsaceus Vved. - Tajikistan, Uzbekistan, Turkmenistan
Lagochilus hindukushi Kamelin & Gubanov - Afghanistan
Lagochilus hirsutissimus Vved - Uzbekistan, Kyrgyzstan, Tajikistan
Lagochilus hirtus Fisch. & C.A.Mey. - Kazakhstan, Xinjiang
Lagochilus hispidus (Bél.) Fisch. & C.A.Mey. - Iran
Lagochilus ilicifolius Bunge ex Benth. - Tuva Republic in Russia, Mongolia, Gansu, Inner Mongolia, Ningxia, Shaanxi 
Lagochilus inebrians Bunge - Tajikistan, Uzbekistan, Turkmenistan
Lagochilus kaschgaricus Rupr. - Kazakhstan, Kyrgyzstan, Xinjiang
Lagochilus knorringianus Pavlov - Kazakhstan, Uzbekistan, Kyrgyzstan, Tajikistan
Lagochilus kschtutensis Knorring - Tajikistan
Lagochilus lanatonodus C.Y.Wu & S.J.Hsuan - Xinjiang
Lagochilus leiacanthus Fisch. & C.A.Mey. - Xinjiang, Kazakhstan
Lagochilus longidentatus Knorring - Kazakhstan
Lagochilus macracanthus Fisch. & C.A.Mey. - Iran
Lagochilus nevskii Knorring - Tajikistan, Uzbekistan
Lagochilus occultiflorus Rupr. - Kazakhstan, Uzbekistan, Kyrgyzstan
Lagochilus olgae Kamelin - Uzbekistan
Lagochilus paulsenii Briq. - Kyrgyzstan, Tajikistan
Lagochilus platyacanthus Rupr. - Kazakhstan, Kyrgyzstan, Xinjiang, Tajikistan
Lagochilus platycalyx Schrenk ex Fisch. & C.A.Mey - Kazakhstan, Kyrgyzstan, Uzbekistan, Tajikistan
Lagochilus proskorjakovii Ikramov - Uzbekistan
Lagochilus pubescens Vved. - Uzbekistan, Kyrgyzstan, Tajikistan
Lagochilus pulcher Knorring - Kazakhstan, Kyrgyzstan
Lagochilus pungens Schrenk - Kazakhstan, Xinjiang, Mongolia
Lagochilus quadridentatus Jamzad - Iran
Lagochilus schugnanicus Knorring - Kyrgyzstan, Tajikistan, Pakistan, Afghanistan
Lagochilus seravschanicus Knorring - Kazakhstan, Tajikistan, Uzbekistan
Lagochilus setulosus Vved. - Kazakhstan, Uzbekistan
Lagochilus subhispidus Knorring - Kazakhstan, Uzbekistan
Lagochilus taukumensis Tzukerv. - Kazakhstan
Lagochilus turkestanicus Knorring - Uzbekistan, Kyrgyzstan, Tajikistan
Lagochilus vvedenskyi Kamelin & Tzukerv. - Uzbekistan
Lagochilus xianjiangensis G.J.Liu - Xinjiang

References

Lamiaceae
Lamiaceae genera
Flora of temperate Asia
Flora of Central Asia
Taxa named by George Bentham